Lordville Presbyterian Church is a historic Presbyterian church located on Lordville Road in Lordville in Delaware County, New York. It is a single story frame building built in 1896.  It features a steep gable roof and open, square shaped belfry.

It was added to the National Register of Historic Places in 2000.

See also
National Register of Historic Places listings in Delaware County, New York

References

External links
Lordville Presbyterian Church Website

Presbyterian churches in New York (state)
Churches on the National Register of Historic Places in New York (state)
National Register of Historic Places in Delaware County, New York
Churches completed in 1896
19th-century Presbyterian church buildings in the United States
Churches in Delaware County, New York